"The Devil's Bleeding Crown" is a song by Danish rock band Volbeat. The song was released as the lead single from the band's sixth studio album Seal the Deal & Let's Boogie. It became the group's fifth number-one single on Billboard's Mainstream Rock chart in the United States.

Track listing
 Digital download
"The Devil's Bleeding Crown" — 3:58

Charts

Weekly charts

Year-end charts

Certifications

References

2016 singles
Volbeat songs
2016 songs
Songs written by Michael Poulsen
Republic Records singles